Bethesda Presbyterian Church may refer to:

 Bethesda Presbyterian Church (Edwards, Mississippi)
 Bethesda Presbyterian Church (Aberdeen, North Carolina)
 Bethesda Presbyterian Church (Houstonville, North Carolina)
 Bethesda Presbyterian Church (Camden, South Carolina)
 Bethesda Presbyterian Church (McConnells, South Carolina)
 Bethesda Presbyterian Church (Russellville, Tennessee)

See also 
 Bethesda Church (disambiguation)
 Bethesda Meeting House, Bethesda, Maryland